Radiance:  The Experience of Light is a 1978 short debut film created and narrated by filmmaker, Dorothy Fadiman.  The film documents the presence of light as a universal symbol for "Spirit", to people from many cultures. The film weaves together images, music and a poetic narration, revealing how light continues to ignite inspiration in religion, philosophy, art, and architecture throughout human history.

Reception

Colin Higgins who directed and wrote the screenplay for the film,  Harold and Maude, called it "Beautifully crafted, personal and profound. It was for me a totally spiritual experience."

The film was featured as part of the evening with the theme, "Art of Film," at the  16th Annual Independents' Film Festival in Tampa, Florida in 2009.

Radiance: The Experience of Light received the following awards:
Columbus International Film & Video Festival:  Chris Award
Religious Educators Media Award
Whole Life Expo Media Festival/San Francisco
Virgin Islands/Miami International Film Festival

References

External links 
 RADIANCE: The Experience of Light at YouTube
 RADIANCE: The Experience of Light at vimeo.com

1978 films
Documentary films about spirituality
Films directed by Dorothy Fadiman
American short documentary films
1978 directorial debut films
1970s English-language films
1970s American films